Ninam is a census village in Satara district, in the Indian state of Maharashtra. It is a village surrounded by greenery and farms but also mountains. Agriculture is the main land use in the village with more than 75% of the total area being used for agricultural activities. The village close to historic Ajinkyatara fort, which is to the north. The large Jyotirlinga temple is in the center of the village.

Geography 
Sonapur, Mandave, Padali, Dolegaon, Bhatmarali, Kusavade, are nearby villages.

Ninam is bordered by Satara Taluka on the north, Satara and Karad talukas on the south, Koregaon Taluka on the east, and  Patan Taluka on the west.

Wai and Mahabaleswar are other nearby cities.

Nearby districts 
 Pune – 
 Sangli – 
 Kolhapur – 
 Raigad – 
 Ratnagiri –

Climate and rainfall 
The climate is usually pleasant during the summer, but it is very cold during the monsoon, which starts in June with maximum precipitation in July and August.

Demographics 
 Indian census, Ninam has population of 2,865 in 650 households, of which 1,389 are males (48.5%) and 1,476 are females (51.5%), for a female-to-male sex ratio of 1.06, which is higher than the Maharashtra state average of 0.93.

In Ninam, the population of children ages 0–6 is 308, which is 10.8% of the total population. The child sex ratio for Ninam is 0.83, lower than Maharashtra average of 0.89.

Ninam has a higher literacy rate compared to Maharashtra as a whole. In 2011, the literacy rate of Ninam village was 86.5%, compared to 82.3% for Maharashtra. The male literacy rate is 92.1%, and the female literacy rate is 81.4%.

Schedule Caste (SC) constitutes 9.8%, while Schedule Tribe (ST) were 0.8% of total population in Ninam village.

Marathi is the local language. The village incorporates people from all castes, mainly Hindu, Maratha, which include Brahman, Naik, Davari, Lohar, Shimpi, Nhavi, Sonar, Matang, Parit, Mali, Kasar, Chamber, and Boudhh. Two clans prominent in Ninam are the Jadhav and Mahadik. Other surname clans include Kadam, Kanase, Salunke, Yewale, Dhane, Pawar, and Nikam.

Administration 
Ninam is a village in Satara Taluka, in Satara District, of Maharashtra, India. It is in Desh, or Paschim, Maharashtra region and Pune division.

The postal code is 415519 and the post office is Padali (Satara).

As per the Constitution of India and the Panchayati Raj act, Ninam village is administered by an elected sarpanch (Head of Village)

Economy 
The village's economy relies mainly on agriculture, and its people are farmers of long standing; but most of the younger generation work in the design field, in MEP and architecture. More than 200 draughtsmen currently work in Mumbai, Pune, and Arab states of the Persian Gulf. Others work in politics, the Indian army, government administration, and education.

Major crops are:
 (irrigated): rice, wheat, Chickpea, sugarcane (ऊस, Ūsa), and peanuts, with growing seasons of 5 to 6 months (except sugarcane, which has a 10-to-12-month growing season).
 (non-irrigated): sorghum (jowar) as both Kharif (monsoon to autumn) and Rabi (winter to spring) crops, as well as peanuts, with growing seasons of 3 to 4 months.
 (cash crops): ginger (for ale) and sugarcane, with growing seasons of 10 to 12 months.
 fodder and mixed planting take place throughout the year.

There is widespread cultivation of fruits such as mangoes, bananas, Coconut and Chikoo, and the cultivation of flowers such as Rose, Tagetes, Gerbera, Dianthus caryophyllus, and Chrysanthemum.

Dams and irrigation projects

The village has one dam, Mandave Dam, at the boundary of Ninam and Mandave villages. The dam's reservoir has a capacity of 0.42 Tmcft and supplies water for agricultural irrigation. Some farmers electrically pump water from the dam's reservoir, while others use well water.

Soil
Black cotton soil is the predominant soil type, as is the case with most of the districts on the Deccan Plateau. Lateritic soil—which covers many parts of the western tahsils of Satara, Mahabaleshwar, Javali, Wai, and Patan—is typically clayey in nature and reddish in color. Soil fertility is especially high in village farms.

Transport

Roads
Ninam Village is well connected to the rest of Maharashtra by road. A bypass was constructed in the 1990s to avoid traffic congestion in the village, which is connected to other nearby villages by small roads.

Nearby railway stations 
 Targaon railway station – 
 Satara railway station – 
 Pune Junction railway station –

Nearest airports 
 Karad Airport – 
 Kolhapur Airport –  
 Pune Airport – 
 Solapur Airport – 
 Chhatrapati Shivaji Maharaj International Airport – 
 Chhatrapati Sambhaji Raje International Airport – Coming Soon

Education 

Nearby engineering colleges
 A.B.I.T Polytechnic Shahunagar Shendre, Satara
 Satara Polytechnic, Satara Khindwadi Satara
 K.B.P. Polytechnic, Panmalevadi varied Satara
 Gourishankar Polytechnic, Limb Khind Satara
 Government Engineering College, Vidhyanagar Karad
 Satara College of Pharmacy Degaon, Satara

Other colleges
 Chhatrapari Shivaji Art College, Satara
 Dhanjay Gadagil Commerce College, Satara 
 Yashwantrao Chavan Science College, Satara 
 L.B.S. College, Satara
 Ismailsaheb Mulla Law College, Satara 

Nearby schools
 Z.P. Primary School Ninam
 T.B.D. English School & Jr. College, Padali (Ninam)
 Shri Ramkrishna Vidhya Mandir & Jr. College, Nagathane
 Maharaja Sayajirao Vidyalaya & Jr. College, Satara 
 Annasaheb Kalyani Vidyalaya, Satara 
 Sainik School Satara

Temples 

Jyotiba Temple is situated at the center of Ninam Village. According to tradition, the original Jyotirling Temple was replaced, in 1730, by the present temple. The shrine is spacious. The temple, including the spire, is surrounded by a strong 15-foot-high wall. Near the north side of Jyotirling Temple is Hanuman temple.

The second temple of Jalav Jyotiba is situated in Jyotirling Nagar (Ninam), about 600 meters from the village's western border. This shrine was constructed in 2010. The interior of the temple is newly constructed but looks ancient. There are other temples and light-towers on the premises.

There are many other temples in Ninam: Lakshmi mata, Bhavani mata, Shiva, Dattatreya, Vithoba, Rukmini, Rama, Lakshmana, and Sita temples.

Festivals
On Hanuman Jayanti, an important festival in the Hindu calendar, a big fair is held. Before the fair was established at Ninam, villagers would go to Wadi Ratnagiri in Kolhapur district to celebrate. After the completion of the Wadi Ratnagiri Fair, all villagers bringing back (Sasan Stick) at Padali Ninam of their village fair, in time for prayer. A first-place Sasan-stick prize is awarded by Ninam (Padali) village, when Many of devotees come with tall (Sasan) sticks.

The deity of the temple is known by the same name, and is held by the locals to be an incarnation of three gods: Brahma, Vishnu, Mahesha, and Jamadagni. The fair takes place annually on the night of the full moon of the Hindu months of Chaitra and Vaishakha. Due to the scattering of gulal, an entire mountain is turned pink. Being that Sunday is the day dedicated to Jyotiba, there is a rush of people.

Cuisine 
The cuisine is usually very spicy and includes Bhakri, rice, Harbara (i.e. Gram), Dal, and vegetables such as Fenugreek and Brinjal. Non-vegetarians prefer mutton, chicken, and eggs. Other foods are papads especially made of Sago for fasting and Kharda (खरडा), a ground green chili-paste chutney fried with onion and garlic paste. Kanda Bhaji, Misal, vada pav and Bhel are some of the favorite breakfast snacks. Kandi Peda is for people who have a sweet tooth, as is locally made Sevai served with hot milk and jaggery as a local dessert. Eating groundnuts boiled in hot salted water and sun-dried is a favorite local pastime. Chakulya (चकुल्या)—a local delicacy made of wheat flour strips cut, put into a spicy dal, and served with rice and some Ghee—is only found here.

Tourist attractions 
 Pandavghal – 
 Patil Wada – 
 Satara – 
 Sajjangad – 
 Thoseghar Waterfalls – 
 Kaas Plateau –  (Called "Valley of flowers of Maharashtra" and is a World Heritage Site.)
 Chalake Wadi – 
 Shri Bhavani Museum, Aundh, Satara – 
 Panchgani – 
 Mahabaleshwar – 
 Koyna Dam –

Forts 
 Ajinkyatara – 
 Sajjangad  –

References 

Villages in Satara district